Shulamis or Shulamit is the feminine form of the Hebrew name Solomon (in Hebrew, "Shlomo"), related to the word "shalom", or "peace". See Salome (disambiguation). "Shula" is a shortened form.
The name Salome is also a related form. See also: 

Shulamith may also refer to:

 Shulamith School for Girls
 Shulamith, a play by Abraham Goldfaden
 Shulamith (cat), the cat that founded the American Curl breed
 Shulamith (album), the 2013 album by Poliça

People
 Shulamite, the name ascribed to the female protagonist in the Song of Songs in the Hebrew Bible.
 Shulamit Aloni (1928-2014), Israeli politician and left-wing activist
 Shulamith Firestone
 Shulamit Goldstein (born 1968), Israeli Olympic rhythmic gymnast
 Shulamith Hareven
 Shulamit Katznelson, Israeli educator
 Shulamith Muller, South African activist
 Shulamit Ran
 Shulamith Shahar, Israeli historian

Conservatory
 Ron Shulamit Conservatory, Israeli music conservatory

Jewish given names
Feminine given names